Medicosma sessiliflora is a species of shrub or small tree in the family Rutaceae and is endemic to far north Queensland. It has simple elliptical to egg-shaped leaves with the narrower end towards the base and cream-coloured flowers borne singly or in small groups in leaf axils.

Description

Taxonomy
This species was first formally described in 1936 by Cyril Tenison White who gave it the name Melicope sessiliflora and published the description in the Proceedings of the Royal Society of Queensland from specimens collected by Leonard John Brass in the Mossman Gorge. In 1985 Thomas Gordon Hartley changed the name to Medicosma sessiliflora in the Australian Journal of Botany.

Distribution and habitat

Conservation status
This species is classified as of "least concern" under the Queensland Government Nature Conservation Act 1992.

References

sessiliflora
Sapindales of Australia
Flora of Queensland
Plants described in 1936
Taxa named by Cyril Tenison White